Water seal may refer to:

Liquid trap seal in plumbing traps
Underwater seal in pleural drainage apparatuses
Waterproofing